Yahya Bennani, also spelled Yahia Bennani (born 3 December 1962) is a Moroccan diplomat currently serving as the ambassador of Morocco to Kuwait. Yahya Bennani is the son of General Abdelziz Bennani.

Career
Bennani is a graduate of the Moroccan school of administration ENA (Ecole Nationale d'Administration). In 1992 he worked as a division chief in the Moroccan external intelligence agency, the DGED. In 1994 he held the position of adviser in the Moroccan embassy in Paris, before being appointed as an adviser in the cabinet of the DGED's director in 1996, a position he held until 2003, where he became a member of the cabinet of the minister of foreign affairs Mohammed Benaissa.

Between 2007 and 2011 he was Consul General in Colombes. In 2011 he became ambassador of Morocco to Kuwait.

References

1962 births
Moroccan expatriates in France
Ambassadors of Morocco
Ambassadors of Morocco to Kuwait
Living people
Moroccan civil servants
People of Moroccan intelligence agencies